Bacardi Superior is a white rum made by the Bacardi Company. In the US it is bottled at 80 proof (40% abv) and at 75 proof (37.5% abv) in the UK and Continental Europe. This rum is mostly used to make cocktails calling for a white rum such as Cuba Libre, Daiquiri, Piña Colada, Mojito, and Bacardi cocktail.

Other Bacardi products
Aged rums
 Bacardi Oro (Gold)
 Bacardi Black
 Bacardi 151
 Bacardi Añejo
 Bacardi 8

Flavored rums
 Bacardi Limón – lemon flavored
 Bacardi Peach Red – peach flavored
 Bacardi Razz – raspberry flavored
 Bacardi O – orange flavored
 Bacardi Big Apple – apple flavored
 Bacardi Grand Melon – watermelon flavored
 Bacardi Banana - banana flavored
 Bacardi Cóco – coconut flavored
 Bacardi Dragon Berry – strawberry flavored, infused with dragon fruit
Discontinued flavors
 Bacardi Vaníla – vanilla flavored

See also

List of Puerto Rican rums

References 

Puerto Rican rums
White rums
Bacardi